Murphy's Haystacks are inselberg rock formations located at Mortana, between Streaky Bay and Port Kenny on the Eyre Peninsula in South Australia.

They are of a 'tumulus' form of weathered granite outcrop. They are made of a pink, massive, coarsely equigranular rock consisting mostly of quartz and orthoclase. Their appearance may be due to a combination of erosion by underground rainwater and then by subsequent weathering after they were exposed. Most of the pillars emerge without a break from the underlying granite. Their structural base may be of orthogonal or vertically-aligned sheet jointing.

They obtained their name because a traveller in a coach saw the formation in the distance. He asked how a farmer could produce so much hay. As the farm was on a property owned by a man called Murphy, the rocks became known as Murphy's Haystacks.

The site is listed on the South Australian Heritage Register.

References

External links
District Council of Streaky Bay webpage
Murphy's Haystacks - Ancient Granite Rock
Murphy's Haystacks YouTube

Landforms of South Australia
Eyre Peninsula
Rock formations of Australia
South Australian Heritage Register